Ruth E. Ley (born 1970) is a British-American microbial ecologist. Ley was an associate professor in the Department of Microbiology and the Department of Molecular Biology and Genetics at Cornell University until 2018. She is currently serving as the director of the Microbiome Science Department at the Max Planck Institute for Biology.

Early life and education
Ley was born in 1970, in England. Her family moved from Surrey to Paris, France, when she was six years old. She grew accustomed to the country and spoke fluent French before her family moved to the United States seven years later to settle in Palo Alto, California.

She completed her Bachelor of Arts degree in integrative biology from the University of California, Berkeley and her PhD at the University of Colorado, Boulder. By the conclusion of her doctorate degree, she became interested in what the microbes were and teamed up with Norman R. Pace to apply metagenomics to salt
flats. During this time, she met her future husband Lars Angenent who was also completing his post-doctoral research at the University of Colorado, Boulder.

Career
Following her post-doctoral research with Pace, Ley moved to the Washington University School of Medicine to work with Jeffrey I. Gordon on the microbiome within the contexts of human obesity and mammalian evolution. She was then named an instructor in 2005 and research assistant professor two years later. She assisted on his groundbreaking paper to show that ones body weight is not solely dependent on how much one eats and how much energy one expends through exercise. They instead found a third factor, the microbial composition of one's intestines. After a dual career job search, they joined the faculty at Cornell University. In 2008, the family moved to Ithaca, New York.

While working in the role as an assistant professor of microbiology, Ley was the recipient of a 2010 Packard Fellowship in Science and Engineering from the David and Lucille Packard Foundation to study how human genetic variation relates to the diversity of the gut microbiome. For the study, Ley investigated how human genetic variation relates to the microbiome by comparing the microbiomes of genotyped twins to determine heritable components of the microbiome . In the same year, she also received a National Institutes of Health Director's New Innovator Award, "to stimulate innovative research and support promising new investigators who are studying biomedical or behavioral research conditions." As a result of her academic achievements, Ley was awarded the 2014 Young Investigator Award from the International Society for Microbial Ecology.

Ley was appointed the part-time director of the Microbiome Science Department at the Max Planck Institute in January 2016 and full-time from summer 2016 and beyond. During the COVID-19 pandemic, Ley was the recipient of the 2020 Otto Bayer Award and Early Excellence in Science Award "for her groundbreaking research into the human microbiome." She was also elected a Fellow of the German National Academy of Sciences Leopoldina and European Molecular Biology Organization.

References

External links

Living people
1970 births
American ecologists
Women ecologists
UC Berkeley College of Natural Resources alumni
University of Colorado Boulder alumni
Cornell University faculty
Max Planck Institute directors